Back to the Woods is a 1919 American short comedy film featuring Harold Lloyd. It was produced by Goldwyn Pictures when it and many other early film studios in America's first motion picture industry were based in Fort Lee, New Jersey at the beginning of the 20th century. A print of the film survives in the Archiva Nationala de Filme film archive.

Cast
 Harold Lloyd as A Millionaire
 Snub Pollard as His Valet
 Bebe Daniels as Jeanne, Belle o' the Woods
 Arthur Housman
 Bud Jamison

Plot
Harold and Snub are self-proclaimed big-game hunters who stop at a remote outpost.  They hire two native guides to lead them into the woods, but the guides run in terror when they see a rather tame bear in the distance.  Harold is annoyed that he cannot find any bears to hunt—unaware that two timid bears are closely following him.  Meanwhile Snub encounters an equally tame wildcat who eats his picnic lunch.  Snub sprints away.  Back at the outpost, Harold twice rescues Jeanne—once from the clutches of an unwanted suitor and once from one of the bears.  The grateful, gun-toting Jeanne tells Harold she wants him to be her "sweetie."

See also
 Harold Lloyd filmography

References

External links

1919 films
1919 short films
1919 comedy films
American silent short films
Silent American comedy films
American black-and-white films
American comedy short films
Films directed by Hal Roach
Films shot in Fort Lee, New Jersey
1910s American films